Gordon Steele may refer to:

 Gordon Charles Steele (1892–1981), English recipient of the Victoria Cross
 Gordon Steele (priest) (born 1955), Anglican priest